The Kosovo national under-15 football team is the national under-15 football team of Kosovo and is controlled by the Football Federation of Kosovo.

History

Permitting by FIFA to play friendlies
On 6 February 2013, FIFA gave the permission to play international friendly games against other member associations. Whereas, on 13 January 2014, there was a change of this permit that forbade Kosovo to play against the national teams of the countries of the former Yugoslavia. Club teams were also allowed to play friendlies and this happened after a FIFA Emergency Committee meeting. However, it was stipulated that clubs and representative teams of the Football Federation of Kosovo may not display national symbols as flags, emblems, etc. or play national anthems. The go-ahead was given after meetings between the Football Association of Serbia and Sepp Blatter.

Membership in UEFA and FIFA

In September 2015 at an UEFA Executive Committee meeting in Malta was approved the request from the federation to the admission in UEFA to the next Ordinary Congress to be held in Budapest. On 3 May 2016, at the Ordinary Congress. Kosovo were accepted into UEFA after members voted 28–24 in favor of Kosovo. Ten days later, Kosovo was accepted in FIFA during their 66th congress in Mexico with 141 votes in favour and 23 against.

First match
Kosovo in most of the time has organized training camps in Kosovo and Europe with different players from the local championship and diaspora. On 3 May 2018, Kosovo for first time in its history played a friendly match against Albania and the match ended with a 1–1 away draw and the starting line-up of that match was Rijad Bytyqi (GK), Albert Raçi, Albin Nishori, Arian Hetemi, Dardan Ibishi, Diar Halili, Dion Berisha, Eduard Ibrahimi, Elion Mahmuti, Ilhan Majić and Sadri Pacolli.

Competitive record

UEFA U15 Development Tournament
Kosovo participated in the UEFA U15 Development Tournament for the first time in August 2019, where took first place after winning two matches against Albania (2–1) and North Macedonia (0–1) and drew without goals against Montenegro. One month later, Kosovo again participated in the UEFA U15 Development Tournament, where again took first place after winning all three matches against Tajikistan (8–0), Estonia (3–0) and Albania (0–1).

Fixtures and results

2018

2019

Players

Current squad
The following players have been called up for the 2019 UEFA U15 Development Tournament.

Coaching staff

Head-to-head records against other countries

See also
Men's
National team
Under-21
Under-19
Under-17
Futsal
Women's
National team
Under-19

Notes and references

Notes

References

External links
 
Kosovo U15 News about the team

U
European national under-15 association football teams